Tomeaka McTaggart (born 9 August 1975) is a Caymanian sailor. She competed in the Europe event at the 2000 Summer Olympics.

References

External links
 

1975 births
Living people
Caymanian female sailors (sport)
Olympic sailors of the Cayman Islands
Sailors at the 2000 Summer Olympics – Europe
Sportspeople from Bournemouth